Adamsite-(Y) (previously IMA 1999-020), chemical formula NaY(CO3)2·6H2O is a mineral of sodium, yttrium, carbon, oxygen, and hydrogen. It is named after Frank Dawson Adams (1859–1942), professor of geology, McGill University. Its Mohs scale rating is 3.

See also
 List of minerals
 List of minerals named after people

References

External links

Mindat.org - Adamsite-(Y)
Webmineral.com - Adamsite-(Y)
Handbook of Minerals - Adamsite-(Y)

Sodium minerals
Yttrium minerals
Carbonate minerals
Triclinic minerals
Minerals in space group 2